The action comedy is a genre that combines aspects of action and comedy.

Film
Allmovie describes action comedy films as those with "fast and furious" action yet being "mostly lighthearted", rarely having death or serious injury. The Script Lab wrote, "[The genre] relies on the characters to bring out the humor, while the action scenes tend to be less intense than in the traditional action movie."

Action comedies often have "fish out of water" themes, for example using a starring actor's celebrity to contrast the setting, such as how comedian and actor Eddie Murphy's "streetwise, sarcastic persona clashes with conventional police procedures in the Beverly Hills Cop films" in the late twentieth century.

The 1926 film The General starring Buster Keaton is considered the first action comedy film. Other early forms of action comedy films were swashbuckler films from the 1930s. Allmovie wrote that its "stars combined wit and one-liners with a thrilling plot and daring stunts". In the 1980s, the genre became commonplace, and buddy cop films emerged as an extension of action comedy films such as Midnight Run (1988) and the Lethal Weapon film series. Other action comedies from the decade included The Blues Brothers (1980) and the films of actor and martial artist Jackie Chan.

In the 1990s, action comedy films "became more violent, with fiery deaths and emphatic shootings increasingly used as punchlines". Rotten Tomatoes wrote that Rush Hour (1998) revitalized the genre's formula and that Lock, Stock and Two Smoking Barrels (1998) was a highlight from the decade. In the first two decades of the 21st century, the films Kung Fu Hustle (2004), Hot Fuzz (2007), Tropic Thunder (2008), 21 Jump Street (2012), and Bad Boys for Life (2020) were among numerous instances of the genre.

TV series
The A-Team (1983–1987)
Burn Notice (2007–2013)
Chuck (2007–2012)
Doom Patrol (2020–2022)
The Dukes of Hazzard (1979–1985)
Future Man (2017–2020)
Kidd Video (1984–1985)
Knight Rider (1982–1986)
Lethal Weapon (2016–2019)
Our Flag Means Death (2022)
Peacemaker (2022)
Remington Steele (1982–1987)
Rush Hour (2016)
Teenage Bounty Hunters (2020)
What We Do in the Shadows (2019–2022)

References

Further reading

Action (genre)
Action comedy

Film genres
Television genres
1980s in film
1990s in film
2000s in film
2010s in film
2020s in film